Incheon Pentaport Rock Festival is a rock festival which is held annually in Incheon, South Korea for three days in August. Launched in 2006, it is considered one of the biggest live music events in South Korea. The festival covers various genres, but mainly rock and electronic music. The name came from the five main themes of the festival: music, passion, environment friendly, DIY, and friendship.

Location
The festival takes place at Dream Park, southern part of Incheon Metropolitan City. The site is about 30 kilometers west from downtown Seoul and it used to be a landfill of capital area like World Cup Park.

Due to COVID-19 pandemic, after being postponed for two months, the festival was held virtually for the first time in August 2020, engaging around 780,000 online viewers. The festival was held virtually for the second time in October 2021.

History 
The festival originally started in 1999 under the name Tri-port Rock Festival, a two-day rock festival held in Songdo, Incheon. Among the expected huge line-up were Deep Purple, Rage Against the Machine, Dream Theater, and The Prodigy but the event was cancelled due to operational and logistics challenges in the first year. After a seven-year hiatus, the festival was rebranded in 2006 with its current name, Pentaport. Organized by Incheon Metropolitan City, the Pentaport Rock Festival has since featured aspiring and prominent musicians and collectives from Korea and around the world.

Line-ups

2022

2021

2020

2019

2018

2017

2016

2015

2014

2013

2012

2011

2010

2009

2008

2007

2006

See also

List of music festivals in South Korea

References

External links
 Official website 

Music festivals established in 2006
Music festivals in South Korea
Summer festivals
Rock festivals in South Korea
Annual events in South Korea
Summer events in South Korea